The Australia national netball team, also known as the Australian Diamonds, represent Netball Australia in international netball tournaments such as the Netball World Cup, the Commonwealth Games, the Constellation Cup, the Netball Quad Series and the Fast5 Netball World Series. They have also represented Australia at the World Games. Australia made their Test debut in 1938. As of 2021, Australia have been World champions on 11 occasions and Commonwealth champions on 4 occasions. They are regularly ranked number one in the World Netball Rankings.

History

Early years 
On 20 August 1938, at Royal Park, Melbourne, Australia defeated New Zealand 40–11. This was the first netball Test between Australia and New Zealand. It was also the world's first international netball match. The Australia team included Lorna McConchie and the umpires included Anne Clark.  Australia were due to tour New Zealand in 1940. However the tour was cancelled due to the outbreak of World War II. In 1948, an Australia team eventually toured New Zealand for the first time, winning all three test matches. The Australia team included Myrtle Craddock.  In 1956, with a team coached by McConchie and captained by Pat McCarthy, Australia  toured England, Scotland and Ceylon. During the tour Australia played their first tests against Ceylon, Scotland and England.

Rivalry with New Zealand
Australia's main rivals in international netball are New Zealand. Between 1963 and 2015, the two teams dominated the World Netball Championships and Commonwealth Games tournaments. Since 2010 the two teams have also competed for the Constellation Cup. Notable and memorable clashes have included the finals of the 1991, 1999 and 2011 World Netball Championships, the finals of the 2010 and the 2014 Commonwealth Games and the final match of the 2013 Constellation Cup.

Tournament history

Netball World Cup
Australia has competed at every World Netball Championships and/or Netball World Cup since the 1963 inaugural tournament. Between 1963 and 2015, Australia have won 11 championships. With a team coached by Lorna McConchie, captained by Joyce Brown and also featuring Margaret Caldow and Wilma Ritchie, Australia were the inaugural champions after winning all ten matches during the 1963 tournament.  In 2005, the 1963 team were inducted into the Sport Australia Hall of Fame.  In the 1991 final,   Australia defeated reigning champions, New Zealand, 53–52 at a packed Sydney Entertainment Centre. New Zealand held a one point lead at each change, Australia then went ahead with minutes to go. With seconds to spare, Roselee Jencke made a match-saving intercept to ensure a one-goal victory for Australia. The match, which was broadcast live on Network 10, was hailed as one of the greatest netball games ever. Bob Hawke, the Prime Minister of Australia and a lifelong sports enthusiast, called it the best sporting contest he had seen. It was also the first of a hat-trick of World titles for Australia. In 1992, the team and their head coach, Joyce Brown, were all awarded the Medal of the Order of Australia. In 2012 they were inducted into the Sport Australia Hall of Fame. In the 1999 final, Australia were trailing New Zealand 28–34 after three quarters. However, they snatched the title 42–41 with a last minute goal from Sharelle McMahon. The win gave Australia its third straight world title. In 2014, the 1999 team became the third Australia national netball team to be inducted into the Sport Australia Hall of Fame.

World Games
Between 1985 and 1993, Australia competed at the World Games, winning one gold and two silver medals.

Commonwealth Games
Australia has competed at every netball tournament at the Commonwealth Games. In 1990 they defeated New Zealand in a one-off match when netball was a demonstration sport. Between 1998 and 2018 they have played in every tournament final, winning three gold and three silver medals. In 1998, Jill McIntosh guided Australia to the inaugural Commonwealth title after they defeated New Zealand 42–39 in the final. In 2002, Australia defended their title, again after defeating New Zealand in the final, this time courtesy of a Sharelle McMahon goal in double extra time. 

During the 2010 Commonwealth Games opening ceremony, McMahon, now team captain,  carried  the flag for the overall Australia team.  In 2014, Australia won their third Commonwealth title after defeating New Zealand 58–40 in the final. Caitlin Bassett scored 49 from 53 at 92% accuracy to clinch the title.

Constellation Cup
Since 2010 Australia and New Zealand have competed for the Constellation Cup.

Netball Quad Series
\Since 2016, Australia have competed in the Netball Quad Series, playing against England, New Zealand and South Africa.

Fast5 Netball World Series
When competing at the Fast5 Netball World Series, the team is referred to as the Fast5 Flyers.

Home venues
The Diamonds have played their home matches at various home venues around Australia. The courts they most recently used include:

Notable players

2022-23 Squad

Notable past players
Captains

Award winners

Head coaches

Sponsorship

Honours

World Netball Championships/INF Netball World Cup
Winners: 1963, 1971, 1975, 1979, 1983, 1991, 1995, 1999, 2007, 2011, 2015: 11 
Runners up: 1967, 1987, 2003, 2019: 4 
Commonwealth Games
Winners: 1998, 2002, 2014: 3
Runners Up: 2006, 2010, 2018: 3 
Constellation Cup
Winners: 2010, 2011, 2013, 2014, 2015, 2016, 2017, 2018, 2019: 9   
Runners Up: 2012, 2021: 2 
Netball Quad Series
Winners: 2016, 2017 (January/February), 2018 (January), 2018 (September), 2019, 2022, 2023: 7 
Runners Up: 2017 (August/September): 1
World Games
Winners: 1993: 1
Runners up: 1985, 1989: 2
Fast5 Netball World Series
Runners up: 2013, 2014, 2016: 3

Controversy
22/10/22 - In a separate blistering statement, Rinehart and Hancock slammed “virtue signaling” by sports teams after sensationally tearing up its $15 million netball deal.

References

External links
 Official team website
 Netball Australia website

 
 
Netball
National netball teams of Asia
National netball teams of Oceania
Netball